The Sage 17 is an American trailerable sailboat that was designed by Jerry Montgomery as a daysailer and a pocket cruiser and first built in 2011.

Production
The design has been built by Sage Marine in Golden, Colorado, United States since 2011, although production was suspended in 2020 due to the COVID-19 pandemic.

Design
The Sage 17 is a recreational keelboat, built predominantly of carbon fiber, fiberglass with vinylester resin, with teak wood trim. The deck and coach house have a balsa core. It has a 7/8 fractional sloop rig with a single set of spreaders, a plumb stem, a vertical carbon fiber transom, a transom-hung rudder controlled by a tiller and a centerboard or optionally, a fixed fin keel. The centerboard model displaces  and carries  of ballast, with the fixed keel model carries  of ballast.

The boat is normally fitted with a small outboard motor for docking and maneuvering.

The design has sleeping accommodation for two people, with a double "V"-berth in the cabin. The head is located under the "V"-berth.

For sailing the design may be equipped with a  working jib or  lapping jib, an  genoa or a  storm jib.

Operational history
Sail magazine named the design one of its Best Boats of 2013, describing it as, "a pretty, seamanlike little thing that’s sure to draw admiring looks way out of proportion to its size."

In a 1913 review in Sail magazine, Kimball Livingston wrote, "on our test boat, the optional Tiller Clutch made it a cinch to lock off the helm, and with its pivoting centerboard and kick-up rudder, the Sage 17 inspires confidence in shoal water. It's easy to like this boat. Anyone looking for a pocket cruiser more or less like this little one should ask for a dance."

See also
List of sailing boat types

References

External links

Keelboats
2010s sailboat type designs
Sailing yachts
Trailer sailers
Sailboat type designs by Jerry Montgomery
Sailboat types built by Sage Marine